Klaus Scheer (born October 4, 1950) is a German football manager and former footballer.

External links
 

1950 births
Living people
German footballers
German football managers
Sportfreunde Siegen players
FC Schalke 04 players
1. FC Kaiserslautern players
SC Westfalia Herne players
1. FC Saarbrücken managers
SC Austria Lustenau managers
SV Elversberg managers
Association football forwards
Sportspeople from Siegen
Footballers from North Rhine-Westphalia